Avinash Rai Khanna (born 30 December 1960) is a Vice Chairman, Indian Red Cross Society and Vice President of Bhartiya Janta Party. He is also a BJP In-charge of Himacal Pradesh. Earlier, he served as ex member of Rajya Sabha and was also a member of the 14th Lok Sabha of India. He represented the Hoshiarpur constituency of Punjab. 
He was elected as an MLA from Garhshankar in 2002. In 2003, he was also elected as a State President B.J.P. Punjab. After that he was elected Member of Parliament from Hoshiarpur Constituency in 2004. Under his leadership, for the first time in Punjab B.J.P. got 19 seats out of 23 in Assembly elections in 2007 and played a major role in formation of Akali government in Punjab. During his five-year tenure as an M.P., he has asked 270 questions and participated in 116 debates.

In 2009 Parliamentary elections his Hoshiarpur seat was reserved. He became Member, Punjab State Human Rights Commission. He served as a member for around 10 months. In 2010, he was elected to Rajya Sabha and was also appointed Chief Whip of the party in the Rajya Sabha.

References

https://web.archive.org/web/20071007101349/http://164.100.24.208/ls/lsmember/biodata.asp?mpsno=4001

1960 births
Living people
India MPs 2004–2009
Lok Sabha members from Punjab, India
Bharatiya Janata Party politicians from Punjab
Rajya Sabha members from Punjab, India
People from Hoshiarpur district